Craig Eigiau is a top of Foel Grach in the Carneddau range in Snowdonia, North Wales, Wales.

It is located on a broad ridge extending eastwards from Foel Grach, leading to a large peaty plateau, Gledrfordd, which ends with the cliffs of Craig Eigiau. The summit consists of a large rocky outcrop. Good views of Garnedd Uchaf, Foel-fras, Carnedd Llewelyn, Pen yr Helgi Du, Pen Llithrig y Wrach, Creigiau Gleision and Pen y Castell are observed.

References

External links
www.geograph.co.uk : photos of Foel Grach

Mountains and hills of Snowdonia
Nuttalls
Caerhun
Mountains and hills of Conwy County Borough